Księżomierz  is a village in the administrative district of Gmina Gościeradów, within Kraśnik County, Lublin Voivodeship, in eastern Poland.

15 March 1942 Germans pacified the village. They killed a dozen or so persons and burnt buildings.

References

Villages in Kraśnik County